1,1'-Binaphthyl is an organic compound with the formula (CH). It is one of the dimers of naphthalene (or literally: dimers of naphthyl). A colorless solid, it has attracted some attention because the atropisomers can be isolated due to hindered rotation between the two naphthyl subunits.  The halflife of the racemization is 14.5 min. at 50 °C.  Substituted derivatives of this parent species, e.g. binaphthol, exhibit much higher barriers to racemization.

References

1-Naphthyl compounds
Aromatic hydrocarbons